Dokuchayev or Dokuchaev (feminine: Dokuchayeva or Dokuchaeva) is a Russian language surname. Notable people with the surname include:

Artyom Dokuchayev ( born 2001), Russian football player
Aleksandr Dokuchayev, Russian early aircraft designer
Vasily Dokuchaev (1846–1903), Russian soil scientist, geologist and geographer.

Russian-language surnames